A police board is an appointed form of local government charged with the responsibility of overseeing a local police force.

In the United States, the term is used for some police departments. For example, the Chicago Police Board oversees the Chicago Police Department. 

In Canada, the police board is charged with overseeing a territorial police department - the term is also used for the same function in Scotland.  Every municipality in Canada that operates their own police force is required to establish such a board.  The legislation of Police Boards is in the jurisdiction of each provincial legislature.

British Columbia, Canada

All municipalities with a population over 5,000 are required by the British Columbia Police Act to provide for a police service.  Municipalities in this category have two options: contract with the provincial government for the Royal Canadian Mounted Police or create an independent local police agency or department.  

Municipalities that choose to operate an independent police force are required to create a civilian oversight body called a "Police Board".  Members of the police board are civilian members of the community and are appointed by the Minister of Justice and Attorney General through an Order in Council. A police board usually has between five and eight members, depending on the size of the municipality.  The Mayor of the municipality is, by law, automatically the Chairperson of the board.  One other member of board is usually nominated by the municipality to represent the municipality's interest.  Board members are selected from a variety of backgrounds and are usually appointed for one or two year terms.  They may be re-appointed to a maximum of six years service. Except for the Mayor, municipal councillors may not be appointed to the municipality's police board.  

The mandate of a police board is to own and operate the independent municipal police department ensuring that police independence from political interference is maintained.  The board functions as:

 the employer of both the "sworn" police officers and the civilian employees of the department and sets the priorities and develops the administrative policies of the department;
 the financial overseer and develops the annual police operating budget in consultation with the municipal council; and
 the supervisor of the Chief Constable.

The board selects and evaluates the Chief Constable and sometimes other senior departmental managers thereby allowing the board to maintain indirect control and influence over the department, although, in the same way that the police board is independent of the municipal council for policing matters, the Chief Constable is independent from the board for operational matters.

Public complaints against the police were formerly dealt with by the police board.  Since July 1, 1998, public complaints are handled by the Police Complaint Commissioner of British Columbia who, as an Officer of the Legislature, is appointed by and responsible to the legislative assembly.  Only level of service complaints and complaints against the Chief Constable are still dealt with by the police board.

Police departments may be amalgamated at the discretion of the Minister of Justice and Attorney General.  This occurred on January 1, 2003 when Esquimalt and Victoria police departments were amalgamated and a combined police board created with the mayor of Victoria as the chairperson and the mayor of Esquimalt as the vice-chairperson.  Enhanced "professional response, crime prevention and investigation in both communities" were cited as the reasons for the amalgamation.

The Royal Canadian Mounted Police (RCMP) are contracted to provide municipal policing to 59 British Columbia municipalities including Surrey, Burnaby, Kelowna, Prince George, Kamloops and Nanaimo.  Police boards are not utilized for RCMP municipalities.

There are currently 11 municipal police boards in British Columbia:

 City of Vancouver, British Columbia - population: 569,814 - number of police officers: 1,124 - police to population ratio is 1:507
 City of Abbotsford, British Columbia - population: 127,712 - number of police officers: 158 - police to population ratio is 1:808
 District of Saanich, British Columbia - population: 107,964 - number of police officers: 141 - police to population ratio is 1:766
 District of Delta, British Columbia - population: 100,576 - number of police officers: 141 - police to population ratio is 1:713
 City of Victoria, British Columbia - population: 93,097 - number of police officers: 211 - police to population ratio is 1:441 (includes Township of Esquimalt, British Columbia)
 City of New Westminster, British Columbia - population: 59,426 - number of police officers: 106 - police to population ratio is 1:561
 District of West Vancouver, British Columbia - population: 45,212 - number of police officers: 77 - police to population ratio is 1:587
 City of Port Moody, British Columbia - population: 26,690 - number of police officers: 34 - police to population ratio is 1:785
 District of Oak Bay, British Columbia - population: 18,207 - number of police officers: 22 - police to population ratio is 1:828
 District of Central Saanich, British Columbia - population: 16,091 - number of police officers: 21 - police to population ratio is 1:766
 City of Nelson, British Columbia - population: 9,630 - number of police officers: 17 - police to population ratio is 1:566

Exception

The 12th police board is not in conformity with the above description of the Police Board and it does not have any elected representative on the board (whereas a Mayor is elected). The South Coast British Columbia Transportation Authority Police Service is a regional police force for the Metro Vancouver region and its police board is made up of five civilian members (including the chair and a senior management from the South Coast British Columbia Transportation Authority), a RCMP "E" Division Assistant Commander and a Vancouver Police Department Deputy Chief Constable. They are all appointed by the Minister of Justice and Attorney General through an Order in Council.

See also
Police authority
Toronto Police Services Board

References

External links
BC Ministry of Justice, Police Services Division
British Columbia Office of the Police Complaint Commissioner
Police Services Act of Ontario

Independent police departments in British Columbia
Abbotsford Police Department
Central Saanich Police Service
Delta Police Department
Nelson Police Department
New Westminster Police Service
Oak Bay Police Department
Port Moody Police Department
Saanich Police Department
South Coast British Columbia Transportation Authority Police Service
Vancouver Police Department 
Victoria Police Department
West Vancouver Police Department

Law enforcement in Canada